Melissa Jean Archer (born December 2, 1979 in Dallas, Texas) is an American actress best known for her portrayal of Natalie Buchanan on One Life to Live, portraying the role from 2001 until its final episode in 2013. She also portrayed the character of Serena Mason on the  NBC soap opera Days of Our Lives from December 5, 2014, to August 27, 2015, with brief one-off reappearances on September 28, 2015, and October 31, 2017.

Career 
Archer first appeared as "bad girl" Natalie Balsom on the ABC soap opera One Life to Live on July 16, 2001. The character was later established to be the long-lost daughter of original character Victoria Lord, portrayed by multiple Daytime Emmy Award-winner Erika Slezak. Archer previously auditioned for the role of Jennifer Rappaport then later on, she would audition for Natalie then named Valerie.

ABC announced its decision to cancel One Life to Live, along with All My Children, in 2011. Prospect Park attempted to resurrect both series in an online format following their network finales; however, due to funding issues, such plans were abandoned. In January 2013, Prospect Park confirmed that they were attempting to resurrect both series for a second time, which turned into a promising venture. The company was able to sign with the labor unions and get the other production issues dealt with. Archer reprised her role for the series' one-season return, in a partnership with TOLN and Hulu.

In 2014, Archer played Evelyn Preston in the soap opera web series Beacon Hill. In August 2014, it was announced that Archer had been cast in the newly created role of Serena Mason on Days of Our Lives  first appearing on December 5, 2014. In April 2015, Archer was let go from the series. Archer last appeared on August 27, 2015.

Personal life 
Archer married longtime beau Glenn Angelino on August 8, 2008 in Mexico. As of 2012, she resides in the Los Angeles, California area. She filed for divorce in 2015 and it was finalized in 2016.

Filmography

References

External links

1979 births
Living people
American soap opera actresses
American television actresses
Actresses from Dallas